A smock-frock or smock is an outer garment traditionally worn by rural workers, especially shepherds and waggoners, in parts of England and Wales throughout the 18th century. Today, the word smock refers to a loose overgarment worn to protect one's clothing, for instance by a painter.

The traditional smock-frock is made of heavy linen or wool and varies from thigh-length to mid-calf length.  Characteristic features of the smock-frock are fullness across the back, breast, and sleeves folded into "tubes" (narrow unpressed pleats) held in place and decorated by smocking, a type of surface embroidery in a honeycomb pattern across the pleats that controls the fullness while allowing a degree of stretch.

Types of smock-frocks

 The round smock is a pullover style with an open neckline and a flat, round collar. This smock is reversible front-to-back.  A feature of Sussex smocks or round frocks is the lack of elaborate decoration; instead there is fine embroidery on the yoke, collar, cuffs and shoulder.  Sussex smocks were thought to be the most elaborate of smocks.
 The shirt smock or Surrey smock is styled like a man's shirt, with a collar and a short placket opening in the front.  It is not reversible.
 The coat smock worn by Welsh shepherds is long and buttons up the front in the manner of a coat.
 The fisherman's smock is  a fully reversible  hardwearing sailcloth smock typically dyed indigo (or white or red colour) once worn as an outer garment by Atlantic fishermen across Devon, Cornwall, Brittany and the Channel Islands, and other parts of Northwestern Europe, often worn over a knitted gansey. It is now often favoured as an artist's smock by association with the Newlyn School who often depicted characters in this dress.
 The knit-frock (Cornish use), Gansey or Guernsey is a worsted knitted form of the fisherman's smock, often patterned and dyed indigo, it was again traditionally fully reversible and was again found throughout the fishing communities of the Atlantic from Brittany to the Netherlands. It was often oversized to midthigh.

Development

It is uncertain whether smock-frocks are "frocks made like smocks" or "smocks made like frocks"—that is, whether the garment evolved from the smock, the shirt or underdress of the medieval period, or from the frock, an overgarment of equally ancient origin.  What is certain is that the fully developed smock-frock resembles a melding of the two older garments.

From the earlier 18th century, the smock-frock was worn by waggoners and carters; by the end of that century, it had become the common outer garment of agricultural labourers of all sorts throughout the Midlands and Southern England.  The spread of the smock-frock matches a general decrease in agricultural wages and living standards in these areas in the second half of the 18th century.  The smocks were cheaper than other forms of outer garments, and were both durable and washable.

Embroidery styles for smock-frocks varied by region, and a number of motifs became traditional for various occupations: wheel-shapes for carters and wagoners, sheep and crooks for shepherds, and so on. Most of this embroidery was done in heavy linen thread, often in the same color as the smock.

By the mid-19th century, wearing of traditional smock-frocks by country laborers was dying out, although Gertrude Jekyll noticed them in Sussex during her youth, and smocks were still worn by some people in rural Buckinghamshire into the 1920s. As the authentic tradition was fading away, a romantic nostalgia for England's rural past, as epitomized by the illustrations of Kate Greenaway, led to a fashion for women's and children's dresses and blouses loosely styled after smock-frocks.  These garments are generally of very fine linen or cotton and feature delicate smocking embroidery done in cotton floss in contrasting colors; smocked garments with pastel-colored embroidery remain popular for babies.

Parachutist smocks
During World War II, military parachutists wore wind proof jump smocks primarily to cover equipment that may have caused the parachutist to be stuck in a narrow doorway.  German parachutists wore the Knochensack, British parachutists wore the Denison smock whilst US Marine paramarines wore a jump smock as well. Today the name smock is still used for military combat jackets.

Examples include DPM Parachute Smock, that replaced the Denison Smock, the Canadian Para Smock and Smock Windproof DPM.

Related garments

The Walloon bleu sårot is a dark blue smock worn by men in parts of Belgium  as part of National dress.

The Lèine bhàn was a type of smock worn to church by Scottish men who had broken the law.

See also
 Apron
 Pinafore
 Tabard
 Chemise/Smock
 Frock
 Frock coat
 Gymnastyorka
 Smock mill
 Kirtle
 Surcoat
 Kappōgi
 Artistic dress movement
 Embroidery

Notes

References

 de Marly, Diana: Working Dress: A History of Occupational Clothing, Batsford (UK), 1986; Holmes & Meier (US), 1987.  
 Marshall, Beverly: Smocks and Smocking, Van Nostrand Rheinhold, 1980, 
 Styles, John: The Dress of the People: Everyday Fashion in Eighteenth-Century England, New Haven, Yale University Press, 2007,

External links

 Smocks at the Museum of English Rural Life
 Origins of the smock at Historical Boys' Clothing
 Men's Frocks of Other Days
 18th century farmers' smocks
 A Smock and Trowsers, Spade and Hoe, Will Do For My Remaining Days: An Analysis of the Use of Farmer's Smocks by Massachusetts Militia on April 19, 1775 
 The Farmer's or Workman's Smock 

18th-century fashion
19th-century fashion
20th-century fashion
British clothing
English clothing
Gowns
History of clothing
History of clothing (Western fashion)
Embroidery